Yasmine Petty is an American model. Petty mostly works as a runway and editorial fashion model in addition to having worked as an actress and photographer. Petty has modeled at international events such as New York Fashion Week, Italian Vogue, and Life Ball. In 2014, Petty was featured on the fifth anniversary cover of C☆NDY magazine along with 13 other transgender women – Janet Mock, Carmen Carrera, Geena Rocero, Isis King, Gisele Alicea (Gisele Xtravaganza), Leyna Bloom, Dina Marie, Nina Poon, Juliana Huxtable, Niki M'nray, Pêche Di, Carmen Xtravaganza, and Laverne Cox. Petty studied photography at the International Center of Photography in New York City and fashion design at De Anza College in Cupertino, California.

Filmography 
2014: Dragula  Yasmine Petty as Milla a hot club girl (short film) Directed by Frank Meli & Adam Shankman

See also 
 LGBT culture in New York City
 List of LGBT people from New York City

References

Further reading 
A Dispatch from Vienna's Crazy Over-the-Top Life Ball
Galleries: Weirdest fashion from fashion week

External links 
Yasmine Petty official website

Living people
American female models
LGBT people from California
American people of Italian descent
Transgender female models
Year of birth missing (living people)